Adetoyese Olusi (born October 29, 1967) is the Executive Chairman of Lagos Island Local Government. He was the Executive Secretary for the Lagos Island Local Government from January 10, 2015 to June 6, 2016 and also the Vice-Chairman/ Supervisor for Education from 2008 to 2014

Adetoyese ran the office of the Chairman, Lagos Island Local Government in July 2017 as a member of the All Progressives Congress and won the election, defeating the second-place participant with over 13,000 votes. He succeeded Hon. Wasiu Eshinlokun Sanni who ended his tenure in 2014. There has been controversy that Adetoyese was at loggerhead with his brother, Adesola Olusi on who should contest for the position that year.

Early life 
Adetoyese Olusi of Yoruba origin from Oke-Arin, Lagos Island was born on 29 October 1967, into the Royal family of Alhaji Tajudeen Oluyole Olusi and Alhaja Iyabo Olusi as the first child of the family. He is a Prince and the grandson of Oba Sanusi Olusi (The Late Eleko).

He is married to Alhaja Ameenat Olusi and they are blessed with children.

Education 
He attended Kuramo Primary School, Victoria Island and Government College, Victoria Island for his secondary school education. Adetoyese later proceeded to Kwara state polytechnic for his OND and HND degrees in Banking and Finance.

He obtained a certification in Cooperate Administration from the Nigeria Institute of Corporate Administration (NICA).

Working Experience 
Adetoyese Olusi had his first working experience as a Nigerian youth corper where he served as an administrative trainee officer at Federal Ministry of Internal Affairs in Oyo state. After his National Youth Service Corps (NYSC), he went ahead to work for Lagos State Building Investment & Co. (LBIC) as their Supervisor/Banking Officer. Adetoyese also worked with Inland Bank Nigeria Plc. as a Supervisor/Clearing Officer.

Political career 
To kick start his political career, Adetoyese was appointed as Public-Private Partnership (P.P.P) ward party Chairman Ward A3. He got other appointments as the Assistant Secretary (A.D) and L.G.A Ex Officio (A.C.N) Lagos State Chapter.

Adetoyese Olusi also served in Lagos Island Local Government in various capacities, including:
 Supervisor for health under Mrs Aderinola Disu Administration.
 Vice Chairman/ Supervisor for Education under Honorable Wasiu Eshinlokun Sanni (2008 -2014).
 Executive Secretary from 2015 to 2016. 
 Currently Executive Chairman of the Lagos  Island Local Government.

References  

1967 births
Living people
Politicians from Lagos